Friedrich Ludwig, Hereditary Prince of Württemberg (Stuttgart, 14 December 1698 - Ludwigsburg, 23 November 1731) was heir to the duchy of Württemberg. His title was Hereditary Prince (German: Erbprinz)

Biography
He was the only son of Eberhard Louis, Duke of Württemberg, and Johanna Elisabeth of Baden-Durlach.

Frederick Louis, however, died before his father, who survived him until 1733. With his death, without male heirs, the main line of Württemberg became extinct and the duchy passed to a collateral line of Württemberg-Winnental.

Marriage and children

On December 8, 1716, Frederick Louis, married Henrietta Maria, daughter of Margrave Philip William of Brandenburg-Schwedt, with whom he had children:
 Eberhard Friedrich (1718–1719)
 Louise Frederica (3 February 1722 – 2 August 1791), who married Frederick II, Duke of Mecklenburg-Schwerin

References

1698 births
1731 deaths
Hereditary Princes of Württemberg
Heirs apparent who never acceded
Sons of monarchs